Ogden may refer to:

Places

Canada
Ogden, Calgary, in Calgary, Alberta
Ogden, Quebec, a small municipality in the Eastern Townships
Ogdensville, British Columbia or Ogden City, alternate names for gold rush-era Seymour Arm, British Columbia
Ogden, British Columbia, an unincorporated locality in the Bridge River Country of British Columbia
Ogden Point, a landmark breakwater, lighthouse and port facility in Victoria, British Columbia
Ogden, Nova Scotia

England
Ogden, West Yorkshire

United States
Ogden, Arkansas
Ogden, Illinois
Ogden, Indiana
Ogden, Iowa
Ogden, Kansas
Ogden, Missouri
Ogden, New York
Ogden, North Carolina
Ogden, Ohio
Ogden, Utah (The largest city with the name)
Ogden Intermodal Transit Center
Ogden, West Virginia
Ogden Township, Michigan
Mount Ogden, Utah
Ogden Avenue, Chicago, Illinois
Ogden Theatre, Denver, Colorado
The Ogden, a condominium tower in Las Vegas, Nevada

Rivers
River Ogden, Lancashire, England, United Kingdom
Ogden Creek, a tributary of Back Creek in New Jersey, United States
Ogden River, Utah, United States

Ships
, commissioned in 1943, and received three battle stars for World War II service; named after Ogden, Utah
, an Austin-class amphibious transport dock; also named after Ogden, Utah

Other uses
Ogden (name), a surname and given name
Ogden (horse), a British-American Thoroughbred racehorse
Ogden (hyperelastic model), used in continuum mechanics
Ogden tables, actuarial tables produced by the United Kingdom Government Actuary's Department
Ogden's lemma, a generalization of the pumping lemma for context-free languages

See also
 Justice Ogden (disambiguation)